The Bondei People (Swahili: Wabondei) are a Bantu ethnic group based in Pangani District in east Tanga Region in northeastern Tanzania. Bondei speak a Bantu language and are related to the Shambaa ethnic group.

The name "Bondei" was given to the people by the Kilindi dynasty  after their conquest, who called them "WaBondei"- people of the valley. This was to describe the people who lived between the Lwengera Valley and the sea east of the usambaras. After the Kilindi Kingdom collapsed in 1868, the Bondei moved southwards from Magila near present day town of Muheza towards southern Muheza District and most of Pangani District. They also moved lands south of the Sigi River. 
However, due to rampant slave raiding after the collapse of the Kilindi kingdom, some Zigua migrants also became the Bondei people for protection escaping to Magila. The Bondei population is roughly 100,000.
Most of Bondei people reside in Pangani District where they engage in different activities, especially small-scale agriculture. Some Bondei also reside in east Muheza District. The first Tanzanian to go overseas was a Bondei man named Dr. Geldart Mhando in 1890.

See also
 List of ethnic groups in Tanzania

References

Sources
 
 Kiango, John G. (2008). Kibondei: Msamiati wa Kibondei-Kiswahili-Kiingereza / Bondei-Swahili-English Lexicon. .

Ethnic groups in Tanzania
Indigenous peoples of East Africa
Tanga Region
Pangani District
Bantu languages